Tropical Storm Percy may refer to:

Western Pacific
 Typhoon Percy (1980) (T8014, 19W) – A strong Category 4 typhoon that brushed southern Taiwan before weakening and striking southeastern mainland China
 Typhoon Percy (1983) (T8320, 21W, Yayang) – Category 1 typhoon that only had minor effects, primarily in the Philippines
 Tropical Storm Percy (1987) (T8702, 02W) – A weak and short-lived storm that never affected land
 Typhoon Percy (1990) (T9006, 07W) – Category 4 typhoon that crossed extreme northern Luzon as a Category 2 before hitting southeastern China as a weak Category 1 typhoon
 Typhoon Percy (1993) (T9306, 12W) – Weak typhoon that hit southwestern Japan

Southern Pacific
 2005's Cyclone Percy- powerful Category 5 cyclone that caused severe damage in the Cook Islands

Pacific typhoon set index articles
South Pacific cyclone set index articles